Motel is the debut studio album of Brazilian band Banda Uó, released on September 6, 2012 by Deckdisc. The album features Douster in "Malandro," Mumdance in "Cavalo de Fogo," DJ Diplo in "Gringo" and Preta Gil in "Nega Samurai." It contains mainly tecnobrega songs but displays influences from sertanejo, axé music, twerk, electro music and pop. On release day, Motel reached the top spot on Brazilian iTunes Store.

"Faz Uó" is the lead single, released on July 17, 2012. "Gringo" was the second single, produced by American DJ Diplo and made references to twerk. "Cowboy" and "Buzios do Coração" were subsequently announced as the third and fourth singles. Rolling Stone Brazil ranked the album with 4/5 stars and placed it at number 9 on their "10 best albums of 2012" list.

Track listing 

"Shake de Amor" contains samples of "Whip My Hair," written by Ronald Jackson and Janae Rockwell and performed by Willow Smith.

References

2012 albums